Rundle Park may refer to:

Rundle Park / Kadlitpina, Adelaide, Australia
Rundle Park (Edmonton), Alberta, Canada